Puthimari College, established in 1981, is a general degree  college situated at Soneswar, in Kamrup district, Assam. This college is affiliated to the Gauhati University. This college offers different bachelor's degree courses in arts. There are nine departments and 1267 students in the college. Besides, it offers distance BA courses under K K Handique University and MA courses under IDOL, Gauhati University. The college has an NCC and an NSS unit.

The College was re-accredited "B" grade in NAAC Re-accreditation in 2012.
The College is situated at Soneswar area near the bank of the Puthimari river in the district of Kamrup (R). It is only 36 km from the north of Guwahati, the capital city of Assam. 31 No National Highway connects the college by a PWD road at Baihata.
Late Dulal Chandra Mahanta was the founder principal of the college. Dr. Nityananda Kalita is the present principal.

References

http://www.puthimaricollege.in/mission.htm

http://www.puthimaricollege.in/

External links
http://www.puthimaricollege.in/

Universities and colleges in Assam
Colleges affiliated to Gauhati University
Educational institutions established in 1981
1981 establishments in Assam